La Roche University is a private university in McCandless, Pennsylvania. It was founded in 1963 by the Sisters of Divine Providence as a Roman Catholic college and now sits on an  campus in McCandless within the Diocese of Pittsburgh.

History
La Roche University was founded in 1963 as La Roche College by the Sisters of Divine Providence as a private college for religious sisters. It was named in honor of Stephanie Amelia la Roche von Starkenfels, the first Mother Superior of the Sisters of Divine Providence. The first president of the university was Sister Annunciata Sohl, C.D.P., who served until 1968. The college had begun to admit its first lay students by 1965. It continued to grow, and two years later, La Roche expanded beyond its leased space to construct the first building, the John J. Wright Library.

La Roche encountered financial difficulties soon after its founding. Although closing the college was considered, Sister de la Salle Mahler, C.D.P., president from 1969 to 1975, carried on. The Board amended its charter in 1970 to establish La Roche as an independent, coeducational Catholic institution, while also diversifying course offerings through an affiliation with the Art Institute of Pittsburgh. This partnership made available several new areas of study, including graphic and interior design, which count among the university's strongest programs today.

An enrollment boom made the construction of two new residence halls necessary in the mid-1970s. Under College President Sister Mary Joan Coultas, C.D.P. (1975–80), the college launched its first capital campaign in 1979, garnering enough to construct the Palumbo Science Center, which opened in 1980. During Divine Providence Sister Margaret Huber's eleven-year tenure as president beginning in 1981, the college continued to grow, marking its 25th anniversary in 1987 with the dedication of the $2.5 million-Zappala College Center. The Magdalen Chapel was added in 1990, and in 1993 the college opened the Kerr Fitness and Sports Center.

La Roche's sixth president, Monsignor William A. Kerr, was appointed in 1992 and focused his leadership on raising the college's visibility, while broadening academic, cultural and athletic programs. In 2004, the La Roche College Board of Trustees elected the college's seventh president, Sister Candace Introcaso, C.D.P. In March 2019, the Pennsylvania Department of Education approved the college's request to become La Roche University, a name change that went immediately into effect.

Athletics
La Roche University teams participate as a member of the National Collegiate Athletic Association's Division III. The Redhawks are a member of the Allegheny Mountain Collegiate Conference (AMCC). Men's sports include baseball, basketball, cross country, golf, lacrosse and soccer; while women's sports include basketball, cross country, soccer, softball, tennis and volleyball. La Roche University has won sixteen AMCC Conference Championships including Baseball (2012, 2014, 2015, 2016), Men's Basketball (2004, 2011), Softball (2000, 2001, 2002), Women's Basketball (2011, 2012, 2013, 2014, 2015, 2016), and Women's Tennis (2012). The La Roche University Baseball team also became the first team in AMCC Conference history to win an NCAA Regional Championship after defeating Randolph Macon 4–3 in the NCAA Mideast Regional Championship on May 21, 2016. La Roche advanced to the NCAA Division III College World Series before falling to Keystone 5–4 in the National Semifinals. .The head coach for women's basketball is Kamela Gissendanner, one of the most successful coaches in the country with a record of 152–39.

Facilities
The John J. Wright Library was the first building constructed for the university, built in 1967 and renovated in the early 2000s. Two residence halls were built in the mid-1970s, and the university opened the Palumbo Science Center in 1980. The 1,200-seat Kerr Fitness & Sports Center opened in 1993 and has been updated throughout the years. Current athletic facilities include a baseball field, soccer field, softball field, aerobics room, dance studio, gymnasium, indoor track and a weight room. Tennis courts of any sort, and outdoor basketball courts, have both yet to be added to the campus. Residence halls were added and expanded upon in 1997 and 2003 with the dedication of Bold Hall and Bold Hall II. A classroom building introducing electronic classroom technology was added adjacent to the Zappala College Center in 2002.

Pacem In Terris Institute
Beginning in 1993, the Pacem In Terris Institute has brought students from conflict, post-conflict and developing regions of the world to study at La Roche. The program provides scholarships and assistance, to students from 21 different countries. The students are chosen by their countries on the basis of academic and personal potential, and promise to return to their homelands upon completion of their studies to work for peace and prosperity in their regions.

Notable members on the Board of the Institute are Kim Dae-jung, past president of the Republic of Korea; Queen Rania Al-Abdullah, first lady of the Hashemite Kingdom of Jordan; and Janet Museveni, first lady of the Republic of Uganda.

References

External links
Official website
Official athletics website

Educational institutions established in 1963
Universities and colleges in Allegheny County, Pennsylvania
Catholic universities and colleges in Pennsylvania
Association of Catholic Colleges and Universities
1963 establishments in Pennsylvania
Congregation of Divine Providence